Larysmer Martínez Caro (born 18 November 1996 in Villa Altagracia, San Cristobal) is a volleyball player from the Dominican Republic.

She played the 2018 FIVB Volleyball Women's Nations League, the 2015 FIVB Volleyball Women's U20 World Championship, and the 2017 FIVB Volleyball Women's U23 World Championship.

Clubs 

  Deportivo Nacional (2018)

  Guerreras VC (2019)

References

External links 

 FIVB profile
 FIVB youth profile
 http://www.norceca.net/2018%20Events/XVII%20Women%20PanCup-2018/Calendar-P-2-3/P-3%20for%20match%206_%20DOM-CRC.pdf

1996 births
Living people
Dominican Republic women's volleyball players
Sportspeople from Santo Domingo
Liberos